Fenerbahce is a genus of fish in the family Nothobranchiidae endemic to Africa where they are only known from the Congo Basin.  The current genus name was adopted to replace the genus Adamas Huber, 1979 which was a junior homonym of the genus Adamas Malaise, 1945 of the sawfly family Tenthredinidae.

Etymology
The genus has been named in honor of Fenerbahçe SK, a major Turkish multi-sport club based in Istanbul, Turkey. The name literally means "lighthouse garden" in Turkish (from fener, meaning "lighthouse", and bahçe, meaning "garden"), deriving from an ancient lighthouse located at Fenerbahçe Cape.

Species
There are currently two recognized species in this genus:
 Fenerbahce devosi Sonnenberg, Woeltjes & Van der Zee, 2011
 Fenerbahce formosus (Huber, 1979) (Starhead killi)

References

Nothobranchiidae
Freshwater fish of Africa
Freshwater fish genera